The 2014–15 Alaska Aces season was the 29th season of the franchise in the Philippine Basketball Association (PBA).

Key dates

2014
August 24: The 2014 PBA Draft took place in Midtown Atrium, Robinson Place Manila.

Draft picks

Roster

  also serves as Alaska's board governor.

Philippine Cup

Eliminations

Standings

Game log

|- bgcolor="#bbffbb"
| 1
|  October 22
|  Purefoods
|  93–73
|  Abueva (21)
|  Thoss (13)
|  Hontiveros (3)
|  Smart Araneta Coliseum
|  1–0
|  
|- bgcolor="#bbffbb" 
| 2
|  October 28
|  Talk 'N Text
|  100–98
|  Abueva (26)
|  Abueva (22)
|  Abueva (3)
|  Smart Araneta Coliseum
|  2–0
|  
|- bgcolor="#bbffbb" 
| 3
|  October 31
|  Meralco
|  105–64
|  Manuel (17)
|  three players (6)
|  Banchero (8)
|  Smart Araneta Coliseum
|  3–0
|  

|- bgcolor="#bbffbb" 
| 4
|  November 5
|  San Miguel
|  66–63
|  Baguio (13)
|  Abueva (18)
|  four players (2)
|  Smart Araneta Coliseum
|  4–0
|  
|- bgcolor="#bbffbb" 
| 5
|  November 11
|  Kia
|  85–75
|  Abueva (23)
|  Abueva (20)
|  Casio (5)
|  Cuneta Astrodome
|  5–0
|  
|- bgcolor="#bbffbb" 
| 6
|  November 14
|  Blackwater
|  69–56
|  Menk (14)
|  Abueva (18)
|  Abueva (5)
|  Smart Araneta Coliseum
|  6–0
|  
|- bgcolor="#edbebf" 
| 7
|  November 19
|  Barako Bull Energy
|  78–85
|  Abueva (16)
|  Abueva (12)
|  Abueva (7)
|  Smart Araneta Coliseum
|  6–1
|  
|- bgcolor="#bbffbb" 
| 8
|  November 22
|  GlobalPort
|  87–84
|  Abueva (19)
|  Thoss (8)
|  Thoss, Casio (3)
|  Xavier University – Ateneo de Cagayan Gym, Cagayan de Oro
|  7–1
|  
|- bgcolor="#bbffbb" 
| 9
|  November 28
|  NLEX
|  90–84
|  Hontiveros (21)
|  Abueva (19)
|  Abueva (4)
|  Smart Araneta Coliseum
|  8–1
|  

|- bgcolor= 
| 10
|  December 2
|  Ginebra
|  
|  
|  
|  
|  Mall of Asia Arena
|  
|  
|- bgcolor= 
| 11
|  December 5
|  Rain or Shine
|  
|  
|  
|  
|  Smart Araneta Coliseum (tentative)
|  
|

Playoffs

Bracket

Commissioner's Cup

Eliminations

Standings

Game log

Playoffs

Bracket

Governors' Cup

Eliminations

Standings

Bracket

Game log

Transactions

Trades
Pre-draft

Commissioner's Cup

Recruited imports

References

Alaska Aces (PBA) seasons
Alaska